Dora Petrova Gabe (16 August 1888 – 16 November 1983) was а Bulgarian Jewish poet. She published poetry for adults and children as well as travel books, short stories and essays. In her later years, she also did extensive work in translation.

Biography
Dora Gabe was the daughter of Peter Gabe, an immigrant from Russia, who became the first Jew to be elected to the Bulgarian National Assembly. When she was barred from taking office, she turned to journalism and became a well known public figure in Bulgaria. Dora attended high school in Varna, and then pursued a degree in Natural Sciences at Sofia University (1904). Later, she studied French Philology in Geneva and Grenoble (1905–1906). 
She taught French in Dobrich (1907). 

In 1925, the Ministry of Education in Bulgaria assigned Dora Gabe to edit the series "Библиотека за най-малките" ("Library for the youngest"). 
She also served as editor  of the children's magazine "Window" (1939–1941).

Dora Gabe was one of the founders of the Bulgarian-Polish Committee (1922) and the Bulgarian PEN Club (1927). She served as a longtime president for the latter. 
She was counselor for cultural affairs at the Bulgarian Embassy in Warsaw (1947–1950), and a representative of Bulgaria in the International Congress of PEN clubs.
 
In 1968, she was awarded the title "Honorary citizen of the city Tolbuhin".

She is widely regarded as one of the most successful Bulgarian poets and is beloved by Bulgarians not only for her work but for her deep respect for all arts and her charitable spirit.

Literary career

In 1900 in Shumen, she published one of her first poems called "Spring" in the literary journal "Youth". Soon after, she published a series of poems in the magazines "Thought", "Democratic Review" and "New Society" in 1905–1906. This marked the start of her literary career.
 
In the 1920s-30s, she published poetry for adults and children, travelogues, stories, essayistic fiction, impressions, theater reviews, articles on issues of foreign and Bulgarian literature, biographical sketches  of poets and writers in magazines such as "Contemporary Thought " Zlatorog, "Polish-Bulgarian review", "Democratic Review," "Falling Leaves", "Dobrudjanski review", "Art and Criticism", "Slovo", "Age", "Journal of Women", "Free Speech," "Dawn," "Women's Voice", "thought", "Contemporary", "Journal of newspapers", "Dnevnik", "Fireworks". She contributed to various in children's periodicals such as "Firefly", "Children's joy," "Children's World", "Drugarche", "Children's Life", "Iveta", "Nightingale ","Merry band", "Window" and others. 
 
After 1944, she was widely published in the most popular Bulgarian newspapers and journals, as well as in the children's magazine "Nightingale", "Squad" "Children, art, books," and others. 
"Violets", Gabe's first lyrical poetry book, demonstrates Secession sentimentalism and a deep understanding of symbolism.

Her works have been translated in Argentina, Austria, Great Britain, Vietnam, Germany, Greece, Canada, Cuba, Lebanon, Peru, Poland, Romania, Russia, Slovakia, Ukraine, France, Czech Republic.

Translation
From 1917 to the end of her life, Dora Gabe actively engaged in translation. 
She translated the works of Adam Mickiewicz, Maria Konopnicka, Stanisław Wyspiański, Kazimierz Przerwa-Tetmajer, Juliusz Słowacki, Władysław Reymont, Jan Kasprowicz, Henryk Sienkiewicz, B. Leader, Adolf Dygasiński, L. Staffan, A. Slonimsky, Julian Tuwim, K. Alberti, I. Volker, F. Fletch, Vítězslav Nezval, Karel Čapek, G. Jian, Y. Seifert, A. Slutsk, V. Bronevski, C. Imber, Samuil Marshak, E. Kamberos, R. Bumi-Papa, M. Lundemis, Yiannis Ritsos and many others. She was fluent in Polish, Czech, Russian, French, and Greek.
 
Her most renowned translation works include:
 The series of anthologies "Polish poets" (1921)
 "Anthems" by Ian Kasprovich (1924) 
 "Angel" by J. Słowacki (1925)

Works in English

Honors and awards 
 27 August 1927 - Golden Cross for Merit (Poland)
 20 April 1929 - an honorary diploma from the Peace Council
 30 December 1946 - order "9th of September 1944", III degree
 1 October 1963 - award of the Coalition of Bulgarian Writers for her poem "Homeland"
 21 May 1966 - honored with the title "Marked agent of culture" in the area of poetry
 28 August 1968 - honored with the order "George Dimitrov" for the occasion of her 80th birthday
 23 May 1969 - honored with the title "Gifted agent of culture"
 16 June 1972 - honorary diploma from the Central Union of Professional Unions for the traditional epic story "Mother Parashkeva"
 9 July 1978 - honored with the title "Laureate of Dimitrov's Award" for the poem collections "Wait Sun", "Depths", and "The Thickened Silence"
 25 August 1978 - honored with the title "Hero of the socialist effort" for the occasion of her 90th birthday
 25 December 1978 - honored with the honorable sign of Sofia, I degree
 June 1979 - special award from the Union of Bulgarian Composers for her lyrical poem "Headstrong"
 April 1979 - marked with the award "Petko Rachov Slaveikov" for her literary and artistic contribution to children's and young people's literature

References

External links
 "Dora Gabe" in Pioneers: Trailblazing women in the arts, sciences and society, 2019 exhibition by Europeana (CC By-SA) 
Contains biography of Dora Gabe

1888 births
1983 deaths
People from General Toshevo
Bulgarian people of Russian descent
20th-century Bulgarian poets
Bulgarian translators
Bulgarian women poets
20th-century women writers
Bulgarian Jews
20th-century translators